Twisted by Design is Strung Out's third album with Fat Wreck Chords.  The album was released on May 5, 1998. The album was the last with former bassist Jim Cherry, who left the group one year later, replaced by current bassist Chris Aiken, and died of a heart problem in 2002. It was re-mixed, re-mastered and re-released on April 15, 2014 as part of the first volume of Strung Out's 20th anniversary box set. The album received positive reviews by critics and fans alike.

Track listing
All lyrics by Jason Cruz except * by Jim Cherry
All leads by Rob Ramos except "Asking For The World" by Jake Kiley

"Too Close to See" – 3:01 (Rob)
"Exhumation of Virginia Madison" – 2:20 (Jake, Rob)
"Deville" – 2:12 (Rob)
"Mind of My Own" – 2:33 (Jim*)
"Reason to Believe" – 2:15 (Jim*, Jake, Rob)
"Crossroads" – 2:54 (Jake, Jim)
"Paperwalls" – 3:23 (Jake, Rob)
"Ice Burn" – 2:09 (Jake, Rob)
"Ultimate Devotion" – 2:06 (Jim*)
"King Alvarez" – 2:22 (Rob)
"Asking For The World" – 2:25 (Jim)
"Tattoo" – 2:23 (Rob*)
"Just Like Me" – 2:04 (Jim*)
"Matchbook" – 4:24 (Rob)

Personnel
Jason Cruz – Lead vocals
Jake Kiley – Guitar
Rob Ramos – Guitar
Jordan Burns – Drums
Jim Cherry – Bass
Ulrich Wild – Producer, Engineer
Jeff Robinson – Assistant engineer
Jodi Wille – Photography
Tom Baker – Mastering
Famous Nick – Design, Layout design

References

1998 albums
Strung Out albums
Fat Wreck Chords albums
Albums produced by Ulrich Wild